Halil Ibrahim Köse (born 21 April 1997) is a footballer who plays as a midfielder for Belgian club Knokke. Born in Belgium, he represented Turkey at youth international level.

Career statistics

Club

Notes

References

1997 births
Sportspeople from Sint-Niklaas
Footballers from East Flanders
Belgian people of Turkish descent
Living people
Turkish footballers
Turkey youth international footballers
Belgian footballers
Association football midfielders
A.F.C. Tubize players
K.S.K. Ronse players
RFC Liège players
Royal Knokke F.C. players
Challenger Pro League players
Belgian National Division 1 players